Konstantinos Mourikis (born 11 July 1988, Marousi) is a Greek water polo player. He was part of the Greek team that won the bronze medal at the 2015 World Championship and the bronze medal at the 2016 World League and 2020 World League

At the 2012 Summer Olympics, he competed for the Greece men's national water polo team in the men's event.

He was a member of the team that competed for Greece at the 2016 Summer Olympics.  They finished in 6th place.

He plays for Greek powerhouse Olympiacos, with whom he won the 2017–18 LEN Champions League.

Honours

Club
Panionios
LEN Euro Cup runners-up: 2008–09, 2010–11
Olympiacos 
LEN Champions League: 2017–18 ;runners-up: 2015–16, 2018–19
Greek Championship:     2012–13, 2013–14, 2014–15, 2015–16, 2016–17, 2017–18, 2018–19, 2019–20, 2020–21, 2021–22, 2022–23
Greek Cup: 2012–13, 2013–14, 2014–15, 2015–16, 2017–18, 2018–19, 2019–20, 2020–21, 2021–22, 2022–23
Greek Super Cup: 2018, 2019, 2020

National team
  Silver Medal in Olympic games 2020, Tokyo
  Silver Medal in 2018 Mediterranean Games, Tarragona
  Bronze Medal in 2013 Mediterranean Games, Mersin
  Bronze Medal in 2015 World Championship, Kazan
  Bronze Medal in 2016 World League, Huizhou 
  Bronze Medal in 2020 World League, Tbilisi
 4th place in 2016 European Championship, Belgrade
 4th place in 2017 World Championship, Hungary
 6th place in 2016 Olympic Games, Rio

See also
 List of World Aquatics Championships medalists in water polo

References

External links
 

Greek male water polo players
1988 births
Living people
Olympiacos Water Polo Club players
Olympic water polo players of Greece
Water polo players at the 2012 Summer Olympics
World Aquatics Championships medalists in water polo
Water polo players at the 2016 Summer Olympics
Water polo players from Athens
Mediterranean Games medalists in water polo
Mediterranean Games silver medalists for Greece
Mediterranean Games bronze medalists for Greece
Competitors at the 2013 Mediterranean Games
Competitors at the 2018 Mediterranean Games
Water polo players at the 2020 Summer Olympics
Medalists at the 2020 Summer Olympics
Olympic silver medalists for Greece
Olympic medalists in water polo